Ioan-Călin Revenco (born 26 June 2000) is a Moldovan professional footballer who plays as a defender for Petrocub Hîncești, and the Moldova national team.

Career
A youth product of the Moldovan club Dacia Chișinău, Revenco moved to Latvia with the club Spartaks Jūrmala. He made his senior debut with Spartaks Jūrmala in a 3–0 UEFA Europa League win over La Fiorita on 2 August 2018. He returned to Moldova with Dacia Buiucani, and made his professional debut with them in a 1–0 Moldovan National Division win over Zimbru on 5 July 2020.

International career
Revenco's first goal was with Latvia national team in 1–2 Moldova national team at the 26th minute.

Revenco debuted with the Moldova national team in a 2–0 2022 FIFA World Cup qualification loss to Scotland on 12 November 2021.

International goal
Scores and results list Moldova's goal tally first.

References

External links
 

2000 births
Living people
Moldovan footballers
Moldova international footballers
Moldova under-21 international footballers
Moldova youth international footballers
Association football defenders
FC Dacia Chișinău players
FK Spartaks Jūrmala players
Dacia Buiucani players
CS Petrocub Hîncești players
Moldovan Super Liga players
Moldovan expatriate footballers
Moldovan expatriate sportspeople in Latvia
Expatriate footballers in Latvia